Krewa Rampur is a village in Anantnag tehsil in Anantnag district, Jammu and Kashmir, India. Krewa Rampur village is located in Anantnag Tehsil of Anantnag district in Jammu & Kashmir. It is situated 10 km away from Anantnag.

Demographics
According to the 2011 Census of India, Krewa Rampur village has a total population of 2,116 people including 1,139 males and 977 females; and has a literacy rate of 56.19%.

References 

Villages in Anantnag district